An electoral alliance (also known as a bipartisan electoral agreement, electoral pact, electoral agreement, electoral coalition or electoral bloc) is an association of political parties or individuals that exists solely to stand in elections.

Each of the parties within the alliance has its own policies but chooses temporarily to put aside differences in favour of common goals and ideology in order to pool their voters' support and get elected. On occasion, an electoral alliance may be formed by parties with very different policy goals, which agree to pool resources in order to stop a particular candidate or party from gaining power.

Unlike a coalition formed after an election, the partners in an electoral alliance usually do not run candidates against one another but encourage their supporters to vote for candidates from the other members of the alliance. In some agreements with a larger party enjoying a higher degree of success at the polls, the smaller party fields candidates under the banner of the larger party, with the elected members of the smaller party sitting with the elected members of the larger party in the cabinet or legislature. They usually aim to continue co-operation after the election, for example by campaigning together on issues on which they have common views.

By offering to endorse or nominate a major party's candidate, minor parties may be in position to influence the candidate's platform.

By country

Argentina
The Frente de Todos (Everybody's Front or Front for All)) is a coalition of peronist and kirchnerist political parties and associations in Argentina formed in 2019 to support the candidacy of Alberto Fernández and Cristina Fernández de Kirchner in the 2019 Argentine general election.

Juntos por el Cambio (Together for Change) is an Argentine big tent political coalition. It was created in 2015 as Cambiemos (Let's Change), and renamed in 2019. It is composed of Republican Proposal (PRO), the Radical Civic Union (UCR), the Civic Coalition (CC-ARI) and sectors of Federal Peronism since the arrival of Miguel Ángel Pichetto to the national coalition.

Armenia
Prior to the 2018 Armenian parliamentary election, the Republic Party formed an electoral alliance known as the We Alliance with the Free Democrats. Both parties campaigned on a similar Pro-European platform and sought to challenge a competing electoral alliance known as the My Step Alliance.

Barbados
The Alliance Party for Progress (APP) is a Christian and social democratic electoral alliance in Barbados. It was formed on 30 December 2021 by the United Progressive Party (UPP) and the People's Party for Democracy and Development (PdP) to contest the 2022 Barbadian general election. It is headed by the leader of the PdP, Bishop Joseph Atherley, with the leader of the UPP Lynette Eastmond becoming deputy head.

Belgium
Current  include the following:
 Open Flemish Liberals and Democrats, composed of the parties Flemish Liberals and Democrats, Vivant, and Liberal Appeal
 Mouvement Réformateur, composed of the Liberal Reformist Party, the Citizens' Movement for Change, and the Partei für Freiheit und Fortschritt
 Vlaams Belang and VLOTT
Previous  include the following:
 SP.A–Spirit
 Christen-Democratisch en Vlaams/Nieuw-Vlaamse Alliantie
 Mouvement Réformateur/Fédéralistes Démocrates Francophones

Denmark
The Red-Green Alliance was formed as an electoral alliance between the Communist Party (DKP), the Left Socialists (VS), and the Socialist Workers Party (SAP) in 1989. It reformed itself as a unified party in 1991, but the participating parties continue on their own in some ways (for example by having their own separate party newspapers).

Greece
The Syriza Party started out as an electoral alliance but then united into a single party.

Italy
Since 1994, Italian politics has been divided into two main blocs, the centre-right and the Centre-left coalitions; which under various forms alternatively led the country for more than two decades.

Center-right coalition 

For the 2022 general election the coalition is composed of four parties, the Brothers of Italy, League (Lega), Forza Italia and Us Moderates.

Centre-left coalition 

For the 2022 general election the alliance was formed by four parties; Democratic Party – Democratic and Progressive Italy, More Europe, Civic Commitment and Greens and Left Alliance.

Netherlands

Combination of lists
The possibility of combination of party lists for elections existed in the Dutch electoral system between 1973 and June 2017 as a weak form of electoral alliance between two parties. It was abolished in June 2017 after being earlier abandoned for Senate elections.

In a system of proportional representation not all seats are immediately divided, some seats remain undivided remainder seats. In the Netherlands these are allocated by the D'Hondt method. This method strongly favours larger parties (often smaller parties get no remainder seats, whereas the three largest parties get two each). But if smaller parties form an alliance their votes are added up for the distribution of seats, so this increases their chances of getting one. With a lijstverbinding or kartel two parties can pool their votes in order to gain more remainders seats.

Often these two parties are ideologically related, in the 2003 general elections for example the Socialist Party and GreenLeft formed a lijstverbinding. In the 2004 European elections the social-democratic PvdA and GreenLeft formed a lijstverbinding. The Orthodox Protestant Reformed Political Party and Christian Union also usually form a lijstverbinding.

Common list
In a common list two or more political parties share a list and often have a common political programme for the election. The participating political parties are identifiable for the voters because the names of these parties are mentioned on the voting paper. It is similar to electoral fusion.

Turkey

Holy Alliance 
An electoral alliance called "holy alliance" was formed by Welfare Party, Nationalist Task Party and Reformist Democracy Party to contest in the 1991 Turkish general election.

SHP-HEP Alliance 
Before the 1991 Turkish general election, social democratic SHP and pro-Kurdish HEP formed an electoral alliance.

Nation Alliance 

The Nation Alliance (Turkish: Millet İttifakı) is an electoral alliance in Turkey made up of some of the major Turkish opposition parties to contest under a common banner in the country's 2018 general-presidential election, later for the 2019 local elections, and presently for the upcoming 2023 presidential and parliamentary elections in June. The alliance consists of Republican People's Party, Good Party, Felicity Party, and Democrat Party.

People's Alliance 

The People's Alliance (Turkish: Cumhur İttifakı) is an electoral alliance in Turkey, established in February 2018 between the ruling Justice and Development Party and the formerly opposition Nationalist Movement Party. The alliance was formed to contest the 2018 general election, and brings together the political parties supporting the re-election of President Recep Tayyip Erdoğan.

Labour and Freedom Alliance 

The Labour and Freedom Alliance (Turkish: Emek ve Özgürlük İttifakı, Kurdish: Hevkariya Ked û Azadiyê) is formed by Peoples' Democratic Party, Workers' Party of Turkey, Labour Party, Labourist Movement Party, Social Freedom Party and Federation of Socialist Councils to contest the 2023 presidential and parliamentary elections.

Union of Socialist Forces 

Made up by the Communist Party of Turkey, Communist Movement of Turkey, Revolution Movement and the Left Party to contest the 2023 presidential and parliamentary elections.

Ancestor Alliance 

Made up by Victory Party, Justice Party, Turkey Alliance Party and My Country Party to contest the 2023 presidential and parliamentary elections.

United Kingdom

Labour and Co-operative 

An electoral alliance survives to this day between the Labour Party and the Co-operative Party, which fields Labour Co-operative candidates in general elections in several constituencies, and in some local council elections. They have jointly contested elections since the 1927 Cheltenham Agreement. As of the 2019 general election, there are 38 Labour Co-operative MPs, the fourth-largest political grouping in the Commons (after the Conservative Party, Labour and the Scottish National Party).

SDP–Liberal Alliance 

The SDP–Liberal Alliance began in 1981, shortly after the Limehouse Declaration. The Alliance contested the 1983 and 1987 elections, and became defunct in 1988, when the parties merged into the Liberal Democrats. In the first few years of the alliance, Liberals and Social Democrats were very confident it would be a success, David Steel even suggesting that Alliance could form the next government. Later on, however, the alliance faced difficulty with political and personal clashes between Steel and David Owen, as well as presentation issues (such as contradiction on policy). When the parties merged in 1988, Owen did not join the Liberal Democrats.

TUSC 

A socialist coalition comprising RMT, Socialist Party, Solidarity, &c. candidates, the TUSC formed to contest the 2010 general election. The alliance has been consistently electorally unsuccessful, also contesting the 2015 general election, but endorsing Labour in 2017.

Unite to Remain 

In the 2019 United Kingdom general election, pro-EU parties formed a pact in English and Welsh seats.

Other examples

United Torah Judaism in Israel
Yulia Tymoshenko Bloc, which functioned in Ukraine, 2001-2011
Unitary Democratic Coalition (Unitarian Democratic Coalition) in Portugal
Labour and Co-operative in the United Kingdom
Ulster Conservatives and Unionists in the United Kingdom
Socialist Alliance in England 
Tripartite Alliance (including the ANC and SACP) in South Africa
Democratic Unity Roundtable in Venezuela
National Democratic Alliance in India
National Democratic Pole in Armenia
Pakatan Harapan (Alliance of Hope) in Malaysia
Progressive alliance in the United Kingdom
Solidarity–People Before Profit in Ireland
Junts pel Sí in Catalonia, Spain
Unidas Podemos in Spain
UniTeam Alliance in the Philippines

See also

 Apparentment
 Electoral list
 Tactical voting
 Political coalition
 Electoral fusion
 Vote swapping

References

Further reading 
 

Election campaign terminology